Atelier Iris 2: The Azoth of Destiny, released in Japan as , is a role-playing video game developed by Japanese developer Gust Co. Ltd. for the PlayStation 2. The game is the sequel to Atelier Iris: Eternal Mana, although lore-wise is a prequel.

Gameplay
The gameplay in Atelier Iris 2 is an improvement over its predecessor in many aspects. The game is unique in having two playable, switchable characters: Felt and Viese.  A large portion of the game is played using Felt, who focuses on exploration and combat. Viese meanwhile, can perform Synthesis to create items and plays more of a support role. Switching between the two is essential to progression and can be done at any save point. Characters can travel to different regions and towns on the over-world map and enter them for field exploration.   

Combat is turn based with a Time Gauge keeping track of player and enemy turns, with the Speed stat determining the order. Up to three active characters can be used in battle at a time with the ability to swap them with reserve members. In battle, the player characters can Charge Attack to gain skill points, Break Attack to delay enemy turns, use various items created through alchemy, defend or flee. The skill points gained can be used to activate powerful special abilities unique to each character. Delaying enemies and pushing their turns to a certain region of the time gauge will put them in a 'break' state, where they are slowed and an attack chain can be executed by the player, offering various perks. At the end of a battle, the party gains experience points and ability points to level up and learn new skills, respectively.

Being the series' defining feature, Atelier Iris 2 has an item-customization and -creation scheme known as alchemy. By obtaining a recipe and the necessary ingredients, items can be synthesized. These are divided into three categories: consumables, equipment, and field items required to progress in the game. Depending on the ingredients used, various traits can be applied to items to improve their effects. While only Viese can perform synthesis at her workshop, when a consumable item is synthesized, the player is given the choice to update the item recipe. By doing so, items of the same type retroactively gain the new traits and can then be made by either character at any time, provided the player has enough Mana Elements, which are obtained through exploration and battle. The player can find new item recipes throughout the game, many of which are required to progress through the story.

In Felt's party, every character can be equipped with two accessories and two alchemy items. In addition to providing stat boosts, alchemy items also provide an additional ability when equipped. Once enough ability points have been obtained through battles, the characters master the ability and gain it permanently. Weapons cannot be changed, however they can be improved with a system similar to item synthesis.

Plot
The game's main characters Felt and Viese, are alchemists-in-training on the tranquil floating continent of Eden, where alchemists and mana (element spirits) live together peacefully. While Viese is a hardworking student, Felt does not take his studies seriously and dreams of exploring regions beyond the Belkhyde Gate, a sealed gateway to another world. When Viese is promoted to a full-fledged alchemist, the two visit a forest so she can make a pact with a mana. While there, a massive earthquake shakes Eden, causing large chunks of the continent to vanish and monsters to appear. Fleeing from the monsters the two come across the Azure Azoth, a legendary Excaliber-like sword said to be the guardian of Eden, and Felt succeeds in pulling it out. He hears the voice of the Azoth and a mysterious woman telling him to journey to Altena Chruch in Belkhyde (now unsealed), in order to restore Eden and prevent further disaster. Before leaving for Belkhyde, Viese gives Felt a Share Ring. 

On his arrival to the new world, he staggers across the Tatalian desert before collapsing and being found by a girl named Noin, who claims to be part of the Simsilt, a rebel army fighting to liberate Belkhyde from the Silvaresta Empire. Felt and Noin rescue Max, leader of the Simsilt, from the Empire's capital city Riesevelt and move to the rebel base. Whilst helping the rebels, Felt and Viese learn about the Share Rings, which allow one wearer to communicate and send items to another, and they put to effect immediately. During his travels Felt meets the hunter Gray, a dragon humanoid who agrees to help him in his quest to restore Eden, and he is also ambushed by a girl named Fee who wants to destroy the Azoth. 

On route to Altena Church, Felt finds Fee poisoned in a forest and saves her an antidote made by Viese. It turns out that there are two Azoths. While Felt wields the Azure Azoth, the Imperial champion Chaos wields the Crimson Azoth, the one Fee intended to destroy. Joined by Fee, the party continues on to their destination. Close to it, they are confronted by Chaos, who easily overpowers Felt and Fee and is only forced to retreat by the timely intervention of Gray. At Altena Church, the purpose of the Azoths, Eden and Belkhyde are revealed and the party finds the Gardo Continental Drive which seals Eden off from Belkhyde. Learning about workshops that stabilize Eden, which suddenly stopped operating, Felt journeys to fix them and slowly restores Eden to its original form. Along the way the party is joined by Poe, a fairy who accidentally crossed over to Belkhyde. Meanwhile in Eden, Viese starts taking care of Iris, a mysterious girl that can perform alchemy without needing any mana.

After restoring Eden, Felt helps the Simsilts in liberating Riesvelt. Max and Fee turn out to be siblings and heirs to the Slaith dynasty that ruled before the Empire took over. Chaos uses Exzanosis, the ultimate art of the Crimson Azoth, to petrify Max and disappears. During the celebrations, Felt leaves the party and goes after Chaos alone. Finding Chaos at the Altena Chruch, the two duel but Felt is defeated and petrified by Exzanosis, and the Azure Azoth is damaged. Chaos destroys Gardo, aiming to merge the two worlds together and obtain the reincarnation of Lilith, the mother of all mana. 

Weeks pass and Viese begins to worry. She crosses over to Belkhyde and with the help of Gray, Fee, Noin and Poe, manages to reverse the Exzanosis and reunites with Felt. Eden finally emerges in Belkhyde and Chaos rushes to capture Iris, who is revealed to be the reincarnation of Lillith. It is here that the full story is revealed. Long ago, the alchemist Palaxius created the Crimson Azoth to control Lillith, hoping to gain power over all creation and become a deity. His student, Elesmus, in turn created the Azure Azoth to stop him. While Elusmus succeeded in subduing Palaxius, both poured their life force into their respective Azoths and persevered through the ages. Gardo was made to isolate alchemists and Lillith in Eden, away from Belkhyde to prevent Palaxius from ever achieving his goal. Chaos, a descendant of the alchemists who stayed behind in Belkhyde, in his desperation to revive his sister (whom he loved dearly) was manipulated by Palaxius into setting the events in motion and capturing Lillith. Palaxius betrays Chaos and takes over his body, putting all of Eden and its residents under the Exzanosis spell. Out of options, the party rushes to restore the Azure Azoth and Elusmus, the only force that could save Iris. Succeeding in their task, Felt reverses the Exzanosis over Eden. After chasing him to the Temple of Creation, the party defeats Palaxius and saves Chaos, but Elusmus sacrifices himself to destroy his foe once and for all. With Iris freed and the crisis averted, mana spreads throughout Belkhyde as everyone finds their place in the newly merged world.

Characters
Similar to its predecessor, Atelier Iris 2: The Azoth of Destiny has several playable characters.  Three characters can be in a battle party at once, with the player free to switch the others in and out at any time.

Main
: The protagonist of the game, Felt is a young alchemist who grew up in Eden alongside Viese.
: Felt's childhood friend who stays behind in Eden to help from afar.
: A young fighter, member of the Simsilt, and the first person to join Felt after rescuing him in the desert.
: A mysterious woman brought up in Altena church, with the goal of destroying the Azoth.
: A womanizing fairy who lives in Eden and pursues Viese (along with many other maidens).
: A dragon-like former human knight, renowned for his prowess.

Supporting
: Title character of the "Atelier Iris" game series
: Head of the Eden Temple
: Wise Darkness Mana, who maintains the Eden Temple library
: Green-haired girl who is a friend of Felt and Viese
: Shy Sound Mana, who rarely speaks to anyone
: Noir shopkeeper with ties to Belkhyde
: Light Mana who runs a shop next door to Viese and Felt's studio
: Clumsy Wind Mana who works in Melona's shop
: Humanoid who guided Felt to Belkhyde
: Head of the Altena Church
: One of the game's main antagonists and an Imperial champion
: Second Imperial Champion and Noin's father
: Imperial Champion
: Consul of Riesevelt and leader of the Silvaresta Occupation Forces
: Leader of the Simsilt Resistance Movement and Prince of the Slaith Dynasty.
: Blacksmith and key member of the Simsilt Resistance Movement
: Catgirl merchant from Zwital Village, likes Poe
: Stylist from Grand City
: Titular Azoth of Destiny and Felt's main weapon
: The Azoth of Belkhyde, wielded by Chaos
Rie: Chaos' sister

Mana
As in Atelier Iris, the driving forces behind the game's alchemy are the Mana spirits and Atelier Iris 2 has a greater number of Mana. The Mana and their element are:
: Wood
: Metal
: Fire
Aroma: Aroma
: Darkness
: Stone
: Water
: Air
: Poison
: Illusion
: Sound
: Life
: Light
: Creation; all other Mana are her descendants.

Music
Its soundtrack, composed by Ken Nakagawa and Daisuke Achiwa, was released May 18, 2005 in Japan by TEAM Entertainment. The opening song is "Eternal Story" by Haruka Shimotsuki, and the ending song is "Tachidachi no Tobira" ("Door of Departure") by Mami Horie.

Reception

The game received "average" reviews according to the review aggregation website Metacritic. In Japan, Famitsu gave it a score of 33 out of 40.

Notes

References

External links

 Zale Shine - Shrine to Fee
 

2005 video games
Gust Corporation games
Japanese role-playing video games
Koei games
Nippon Ichi Software games
PlayStation 2 games
PlayStation 2-only games
THQ games
Video game prequels
Video games developed in Japan 
Video games featuring female protagonists
I